Parada de Cima is a hamlet in the parish of Fonte de Angeão, whose municipality is Vagos, district of Aveiro (Portugal).

Villages in Portugal
Populated places in Aveiro District
Vagos